Drilon Shala (born 20 March 1987) is a Finnish former professional footballer who played as a striker. He is of Albanian origin.

Club career
Shala progressed through the Reipas youth academy. He made his breakthrough as a senior player for Lahti, playing for the club from 2006 to 2012.

On 17 January 2013, Shala moved to TFF First League club Tavşanlı Linyitspor. At the end his first season at the club, his contract was terminated by mutual agreement. He eventually returned to Lahti, signing a two-year contract with his former club on 5 November 2013. There, he won the Finnish League Cup in 2016 with a 4–3 victory against SJK in the final; his third League Cup playing for Lahti. He retired from professional football in February 2020, only to return for one more season to play for his childhood club Reipas in the third-tier Kakkonen.

International career
On 27 February 2006, five months after having been granted Finnish nationality, Shala made his debut for the Finland U19s as a substitute for Jami Puustinen during a 1–0 victory against Norway.

Honours
Lahti
 Ykkönen: 2011
 Finnish League Cup: 2007, 2013, 2016

References

External links
 

1987 births
Living people
Sportspeople from Lahti
Finnish people of Albanian descent
Finnish footballers
Finland youth international footballers
Association football forwards
FC Lahti players
FC Hämeenlinna players
TKİ Tavşanlı Linyitspor footballers
PK-35 Vantaa (men) players
Veikkausliiga players
Ykkönen players
Kakkonen players
TFF First League players
Finnish expatriate footballers
Finnish expatriate sportspeople in Turkey
Expatriate footballers in Turkey
Shala (tribe)